Hoseynabad-e Gavahi (also Romanized as Ḩoseynābād-e Gavāhī, Hosein Abad Gavahi, Ḩoseynābād-e Gavānī, and Ḩoseynābād Gavāhī; also known as Husainābād) is a village in Mud Rural District, Mud District, Sarbisheh County, South Khorasan Province, Iran. At the 2006 census, its population was 50, in 19 families.

References 

Populated places in Sarbisheh County